The chapters of the manga series Kare First Love were written and illustrated by Kaho Miyasaka. The first chapter premiered in the March 2002 issue of the bi-monthly magazine Shōjo Comic, where it was serialized until its conclusion in the August 2004 issue. The series focuses on the first romance between high school students Karin Karino and Aoi Kiriya as they struggle to deal with their respective families, their own insecurities about their relationship, pressures regarding sex, and decisions about their futures.

The 57 untitled chapters were collected in ten tankōbon volumes published by Shogakukan between July 26, 2002, and on December 20, 2004. It was adapted into a drama CD by Pioneer Entertainment that includes scenes from the first two volumes of the series. The manga series is licensed for English-language release in North America by Viz Media, which released the first volume on September 7, 2004. The final volume was released on December 12, 2006. It is licensed for regional language releases in France and Spain by Panini Comics, in Germany by Egmont Manga & Anime, in Denmark by Mangismo Danmark, in Sweden by Mangismo Sverige, and in Taiwan by Ever Glory Publishing.


Volume list

References

External links
 Official Viz Media Kare First Love site

Kare First Love